Fatoumata Kanteh (born 8 May 1997), known as Fatou Kanteh or simply Fatou, is a professional footballer who plays as a midfielder or a forward for Liga F club Villarreal CF. Born in Spain to a Gambian father and a Senegalese mother, she represents the Gambia women's national team.

Club career
Kanteh has played for UE Porqueres, EdF Logroño and Sporting Huelva in Spain. She appeared in the professional 2021–22 Primera División for the latter.

International career
Born in Spain, Kanteh is of Gambian and Senegalese descent. On 25 October 2021, she made her senior debut for Gambia. On 9 February 2022, she was called up by Gambia for the 2022 Africa Women Cup of Nations qualification (second round).

Notes

References

External links

1997 births
Living people
People with acquired Gambian citizenship
Gambian women's footballers
Women's association football midfielders
Women's association football forwards
The Gambia women's international footballers
Gambian people of Senegalese descent
Sportspeople of Senegalese descent
People from Pla de l'Estany
Sportspeople from the Province of Girona
Sportswomen from Catalonia
Footballers from Catalonia
Spanish women's footballers
EdF Logroño B players
EdF Logroño players
Sporting de Huelva players
Primera División (women) players
Spanish people of Gambian descent
Spanish sportspeople of African descent
Spanish people of Senegalese descent
Citizens of Senegal through descent
Senegalese women's footballers
Senegalese people of Gambian descent
Sportspeople of Gambian descent